Jean Rogers (born Eleanor Dorothy Lovegren, March 25, 1916 – February 24, 1991) was an American actress who starred in serial films in the 1930s and low–budget feature films in the 1940s as a leading lady. She is best remembered for playing Dale Arden in the science-fiction serials Flash Gordon (1936) and Flash Gordon's Trip to Mars (1938).

Early life
Rogers was born in Belmont, Massachusetts. Her father was an immigrant from Malmö, Sweden. She graduated from Belmont High School. She had hoped to study art, but in 1933 she won a beauty contest sponsored by Paramount Pictures that led to her career in Hollywood. Rogers starred in several serials for Universal between 1935 and 1938, including Ace Drummond and Flash Gordon.

Early career
Rogers was one of seven women chosen out of 2,700 passengers on excursion boats and ferries who were interviewed for roles in the 1934 film Eight Girls in a Boat. The group began work in Hollywood on September 3, 1933. By 1937, Rogers was the only one of the seven featured as an actress.

Flash Gordon
Rogers was assigned the role of Dale Arden in the first two Flash Gordon serials. Buster Crabbe and Rogers were cast as the hero and heroine in the first serial, Flash Gordon. The evil ruler Ming the Merciless (Charles B. Middleton) lusted after her, and Gordon was forced to rescue her from one situation after another.  While filming the series in 1937, her costume caught fire and she suffered burns on her hands. Co-star Crabbe smothered the fire by wrapping a blanket on her.

In the first serial, Arden  competed with Princess Aura (Priscilla Lawson) for Gordon's attention. Rogers' character was fragile, small-chested, diminutive, and totally dependent on Gordon for her survival; Lawson's Princess Aura was domineering, independent, voluptuous, conniving, sly, ambitious, and determined to make Gordon her own. The competition for Gordon's attention is one of the highlights of the film. In Flash Gordon's Trip to Mars, the second serial, Rogers sported a totally different look. She had dark hair and wore the same modest costume in each episode. Rogers matured after the first serial, and  no sexual overtones are seen in Trip to Mars. Rogers told writer Richard Lamparski that she was not eager to do the second serial and asked her studio to excuse her from the third.

Feature films

Despite starring in serial films, Rogers felt she was not going to improve her career unless she could participate in feature films. She discovered that  working in feature films was more tedious. She played John Wayne's leading lady in the 1936 full-length motion picture Conflict and co-starred with Boris Karloff in the crime drama Night Key the following year. During the 1940s, Rogers appeared only in feature films, including  The Man Who Wouldn't Talk (1940) with Lloyd Nolan,  Viva Cisco Kid (1940) with Cesar Romero as the Cisco Kid,  Design for Scandal (1941) with Rosalind Russell and Walter Pidgeon, Whistling in Brooklyn (1943) with Red Skelton, A Stranger in Town (1943) with Frank Morgan, Backlash (1947), and Speed to Spare (1948) with Richard Arlen. Still, she was unhappy with the studios, possibly because she was relegated to B-movie productions on a lower salary. She decided to freelance with companies such as 20th Century Fox and Metro-Goldwyn-Mayer (MGM). Her last appearance was in a supporting role in the suspense film The Second Woman, made in 1950 by United Artists.

Later life
Rogers married Dan Winkler in 1943 after she was dropped by MGM. She continued freelancing until retiring in 1951. Because she starred mainly in low-budget films, she was never a top star. In a 1979 interview, she explained what it was like and why she decided not to play Dale Arden in the third Flash Gordon serial.

Rogers was a lifelong Democrat who supported Adlai Stevenson's campaign during the 1952 presidential election and a practicing Lutheran.

She died in Sherman Oaks in 1991 at the age of 74  following surgery. She was later cremated and her ashes returned to her family.

Selected filmography

Footlight Parade (1933) as Chorus Girl (uncredited)
Eight Girls in a Boat (1934) (with Dorothy Wilson) as School Girl (uncredited)
Stand Up and Cheer! (1934) as Dancer (uncredited)
Twenty Million Sweethearts (1934) as Radio Fan (uncredited)
Dames (1934) as Chorus Girl (uncredited)
Manhattan Moon (1935) (with ZaSu Pitts) as Joan
Lady Tubbs (1935) as Debutante (uncredited)
His Night Out (1935) as Information (uncredited)
Stormy (1935) as Kerry Dorn
Tailspin Tommy in the Great Air Mystery (1935, Serial) (with Noah Beery, Jr.) as Betty Lou Barnes
Fighting Youth (1935) as Blonde Student
The Adventures of Frank Merriwell (1936 serial) (with Donald Briggs) as Elsie Belwood
Don't Get Personal (1936) as Blondy
Flash Gordon (1936, Serial) (with Buster Crabbe) as Dale Arden
Spaceship to the Unknown (1936, edited serial) (with Buster Crabbe) as Dale Arden
Crash Donovan (1936) as Blonde (uncredited)
My Man Godfrey (1936) (with William Powell) as Socialite (uncredited)
Two in a Crowd (1936) as Minor Role (uncredited)
Ace Drummond (1936 serial) (with Noah Beery, Jr.) as Peggy Trainor
Conflict (1936) (with John Wayne) as Maude Sangster
Mysterious Crossing (1936) as Yvonne Fontaine
When Love Is Young (1937) as Irene Henry
Secret Agent X-9 (1937, Serial) (with Lon Chaney, Jr.) as Shara Graustark
Night Key (1937) (with Boris Karloff) as Joan Mallory
The Wildcatter (1937) as Helen Conlon
Reported Missing (1937) as Jean Clayton
Flash Gordon's Trip to Mars (1938, Serial) (with Buster Crabbe) as Dale Arden
Deadly Ray from Mars (1938, edited serial) (with Buster Crabbe) as Dale Arden
Time Out for Murder (1938) as Helen Thomas
Always in Trouble (1938) (with Jane Withers) as Virginia Darlington
While New York Sleeps (1938) as Judy King
Inside Story (1939) as June White
Hotel for Women (1939) (with Linda Darnell) as Nancy Prescott
Stop, Look and Love (1939) as Louise Haller
Heaven with a Barbed Wire Fence (1939) (with Glenn Ford) as Anita Santos
The Man Who Wouldn't Talk (1940) (with Lloyd Nolan) as Alice Stetson
Charlie Chan in Panama (1940) (with Sidney Toler) as Kathi Lenesch
Viva Cisco Kid (1940) (with Cesar Romero) as Joan Allen
Brigham Young (1940) as Clara Young
Yesterday's Heroes (1940) as Lee Kellogg
Let's Make Music (1941) as Abby Adams
Design for Scandal (1941) (with Rosalind Russell) as Dotty
Dr. Kildare's Victory (1942) as Annabelle Kirke
Sunday Punch (1942) as Judy Galestrum
Pacific Rendezvous (1942) as Elaine Carter
The War Against Mrs. Hadley (1942) (with Fay Bainter) as Patricia Hadley
Swing Shift Maisie (1943) (with Ann Sothern)
A Stranger in Town (1943) (with Frank Morgan) as Lucy Gilbert
Swing Shift Maisie (1943) as Iris Reed
Whistling in Brooklyn (1943) (with Red Skelton) as Jean Pringle
Rough, Tough and Ready (1945) as Jo Matheson
The Strange Mr. Gregory (1945) as Ellen Randall
Gay Blades (1946) as Nancy Davis
Hot Cargo (1946) (with William Gargan) as Jerry Walters
Backlash (1947; top billing) as Catherine Morland
Speed to Spare (1948) (with Richard Arlen) as Mary McGee
Fighting Back (1948) (with Morris Ankrum) as June Sanders
The Second Woman (1950) (with Robert Young) as Dodo Ferris (final film role)

References

External links

 
 Tony LoBue's Dale Arden Page
 NYT Article on Jean
 Rotten Tomatoes Jean Rogers Filmography

 

1916 births
1991 deaths
Actresses from Massachusetts
American film actresses
Film serial actresses
People from Belmont, Massachusetts
American people of Swedish descent
Metro-Goldwyn-Mayer contract players
20th-century American actresses
Belmont High School (Massachusetts) alumni
American Lutherans
Massachusetts Democrats
California Democrats